Empress is a  French biographical novel written by Shan Sa, a French author who was born in Beijing.  It is based on the life of Empress Wu Zetian.

2003 French novels
French historical novels
Biographical novels
Novels set in the Tang dynasty
Novels set in the 7th century
HarperCollins books
Novels set in Xi'an
Novels set in Henan
Cultural depictions of Wu Zetian
Novels by Shan Sa